This is a list of members of the 46th Legislative Assembly of Queensland from 1989 to 1992, as elected at the 1989 state election held on 2 December 1989.

 On 6 May 1990, the National member for Landsborough and former Premier of Queensland, Mike Ahern, resigned. Liberal candidate Joan Sheldon won the resulting by-election on 28 July 1990.
 On 13 May 1990, the Liberal member for Sherwood, Angus Innes, resigned. Liberal candidate David Dunworth won the resulting by-election on 28 July 1990.
 Liberal candidate Bob King was initially declared elected as the Liberal member for Nicklin, but the result was overturned by the Court of Disputed Returns on 21 November 1990. The court declared National candidate Neil Turner elected rather than ordering a by-election for the seat.
 On 5 April 1991, the Labor member for Nundah, Phil Heath, resigned. Labor candidate Terry Sullivan won the resulting by-election on 18 May 1991.
 On 23 March 1991, the National member for Toowoomba South, Clive Berghofer, vacated his seat. National Party candidate Mike Horan won the resulting by-election on 18 May 1991.

See also
1989 Queensland state election
Premier: Wayne Goss (Labor) (1989–1996)

References

 

Members of Queensland parliaments by term
20th-century Australian politicians